The following is a list of Sinitic languages and their dialects. For a traditional dialectological overview, see also varieties of Chinese.

Classification 

'Chinese' is a blanket term covering the many different varieties spoken across China. Mandarin Chinese is the most popular dialect, and is used as a lingua franca across China.

Linguists classify these varieties as the Sinitic branch of the Sino-Tibetan language family. Within this broad classification, there are between seven and fourteen dialect groups, depending on the classification.

The conventionally accepted set of seven dialect groups first appeared in the second edition of the dialectology handbook edited by Yuan Jiahua (1961).
In order of decreasing number of speakers, they are:

 Guan (including Beijing and Nanjing variants)
 Wu (including the Shanghainese and Suzhounese variants)
 Yue (including the Cantonese and Taishanese variants)
 Min (including the Hokkien and Fuzhounese variants)
 Hakka (Kejia)
 Xiang (Hunanese)
 Gan (Jiangxinese)

The revised classification of Li Rong, used in the Language Atlas of China (1987) added three further groups split from these:

 Mandarin → Jin
 Wu → Huizhou
 Yue → Pinghua
 Min
 Hakka (Kejia)
 Xiang
 Gan

Summary

The number of speakers derived from statistics or estimates (2019) and were rounded:

List of languages and dialects 

In addition to the varieties listed below, it is customary to speak informally of dialects of each province (such as Sichuan dialect and Hainan dialect). These designations do not generally correspond to classifications used by linguists, but each nevertheless has characteristics of its own.

Gan
赣语/贛語

Mandarin 

 官话/官話

The number of speakers derived from statistics or estimates (2019) and were rounded:

Hui
徽语/徽語

Sometimes subcategory of Wu.

Jin
晋语/晉語

Sometimes a subcategory of Mandarin.

Hakka
客家话/客家話

Min 

 闽语/閩語

Wu
吴语/吳語

Xiang
湘语/湘語

Yue
粤语/粵語

Pinghua

 平话/平話

Ba-Shu
 巴蜀语/巴蜀語

Other
The non-Min dialects of Hainan were once considered Yue, but are now left unclassified:

Mixed languages
In addition to the varieties within the Sinitic branch of Sino-Tibetan, a number of mixed languages also exist that comprise elements of one or more Chinese varieties with other languages.

List in the Atlas 
The extensive 1987 Language Atlas of China groups Chinese local varieties into the following units:
 Supergroup (大区 dàqū), of which there are but two: Mandarin and Min
 Group (区 qū), corresponding to the varieties of Chinese of the ISO standard
 Subgroup (片 piàn), which may be mutually unintelligible with other subgroups
 Cluster (小片 xiǎopiàn), which may be mutually unintelligible with other clusters
 Local dialect (点 diǎn), which are the dialects sampled by the Atlas

In the list below, local dialects are not listed.  Groups are in bold, subgroups are numbered, and clusters are bulleted. 

 Northeastern Mandarin
 Jishen
 Jiaoning
 Tongxi
 Yanji
 Hafu
 Zhaofu
 Changjin
 Heisong
 Nenke
 Jiafu
 Zhanhua
 Jilu Mandarin
 Baotang
 Laifu
 Dingba
 Tianjin
 Jizun
 Luanchang
 Fulong
 Shiji
 Zhaoshen
 Xingheng
 Liaotai
 Canghui
 Huangle
 Yangshou
 Juzhao
 Zhanghuan

 Beijing Mandarin
 Jingshi
 Huaicheng
 Chaofeng
 Shike
 Jiaoliao Mandarin
 Qingzhou
 Denglian
 Gaihuan
 Central Plains Mandarin
 Zhengcao
 Cailu
 Luoxu
 Xinbeng
 Fenhe
 Pingyang
 Jiangzhou
 Xiezhou
 Guanzhong
 Qinlong
 Longzhong
 Nanjiang
 Lanyin Mandarin
 Jincheng
 Yinwu
 Hexi
 Tami

 Southwestern Mandarin
Chengyu
Dianxi
Yaoli
Baolu
Qianbei
Kungui
Guanchi
Minjiang
Renfu
Yamian
Lichuan
Ebei
Wutian
Cenjiang
Qiannan
Xiangnan
Guiliu
Changhe
 Jianghuai Mandarin
Hongchao
Tairu
Huangxiao
 (unclassified Mandarin)
Hubeihua
Henanhua
Nanping dialect
Yangyu dialect
Junhua
Longmen dialect

 Jin
Bingzhou
Lüliang
Fenzhou
Xingxi
Shangdang
Wutai
Dabao
Zhanghu
Hanxin
Cizhang
Huoji
Zhiyan
 Wu
Taihu
Piling
Suhujia
Tiaoxi
Hangzhou
Linshao
Yongjiang
Taizhou
Oujiang
Wuzhou
Chuqu
Chuzhou
Longqu
Xuanzhou
Tongjin
Taigao
Shiling

 Hui
Jishe
Xiuyi
Qide
Yanzhou
Jingzhan
 Gan
Changjing
Yiliu
Jicha
Fuguang
Yingyi
Datong
Leizi
Dongsui
Huaiyue
Xiang
Changyi
Loushao
Jixu
Yue
Guangfu
Yongxun
Gaoyang
Siyi
Goulou
Wuhua
Qinlian
 Pinghua
 Guibei
 Guinan

 Hakka
 Yuetai
 Jiaying
 Xinghua
 Xinhui
 Shaonan
 Yuezhong
Huizhou
Yuebei
Tingzhou
Ninglong
Yugui
Tonggu
Southern Min
Zaytonese (Quanzhang / Hokkien / Taiwanese / Minnan) 
Hinghua (Puxian / Putianese)
Beitou (Quanpu / Zuanpo)
Liong-na (Longyan)
Datian (Duacan / Qianluhua)
Taoyuan
Teochew (Chaoshan / Chaozhou)
Sanxiang (Zhongshan Minnan)
Luichow (Leizhou)
Hainanese (Qiongwen)
 Eastern Min
Fuqing (S. Houguan)
Foochow (C. Houguan)
Kutien (Gutian / N. Houguan)
Songkou (Yangzhong / W. Houguan / S. Minqing / W. Yongtai)
Ningde (S. Funing)
Fu'an (C. Funing)
Xiapu (E. Funing)
Fuding (N. Funing)
Taishun (Manjiang)
Cangnan (Manhua)
Longtu (Longdu)
Nanlang
 Western Min
 Jianzhou (Jianou / Nanping / Minbei)
 Shaojiang
 Yongan (Minzhong)
 Xinqiao (Chitian / Houluhua / Wenjiang)
 Central Min
 Youxi (Chengguan)
 Xibin
 Zhongxian (Jihua)

 Unclassified topolects
 Shehua (the Chinese variety now spoken by the She people)
 Danzhou dialect
 Xianghua
 Shaoguan Tuhua
 Southern Hunan Tuhua

See also 
 Varieties of Chinese
 Written Chinese
 Dialect (discussion of human)

Notes

References 

Chinese
Chinese